Lieutenant-General Sir Charles John Stuart King  (13 October 1890 – 7 January 1967) was an American-born British engineer and army officer.

Family and education
King was the second son of Charles James Stuart King, a schoolmaster and footballer, and Violet Maud Hankin. He was the brother of Edward Leigh Stuart King and Sir Geoffrey Stuart King.

Born in Windom, Minnesota, he went to England where he was educated at Felsted School from 1904 and 1908, where he was captain of both the Football XI and the Hockey XI in 1908.

He later attended the Royal Military Academy in Woolwich, passing out first in 1910 with the Sword of Honour and earning the Pollock Medal. He also studied at the Royal School of Military Engineering in Chatham.

In 1920 King married Kathleen Margaret Rudd and had three sons, all of whom also attended Felsted School:
Rev. John Michael Stuart King (1922-2003), Vicar of Hibaldstow
Lt. Col. Simon Charles Stuart King (1924-2002), army officer and schoolmaster
Richard Anthony Stuart King (d. 1998)

Career
In 1910 King began his army career after receiving a commission in the Royal Engineers.  He served in India throughout the First World War and in the Third Anglo-Afghan War.

In 1929 he became Chief Instructor in military engineering and geometrical drawing at the Royal Military Academy in Woolwich before returning to India in 1932 with the Royal Engineers.

After the Quetta earthquake in 1935 King was appointed Deputy Engineer, then Chief Engineer, to oversee the reconstruction work.

Following the outbreak of the Second World War, King joined the British Expeditionary Force in France as Deputy Chief Engineer (1939-1940). In 1941 he was Chief Engineer for Home Defences before being appointed to the newly created post of Engineer-in-Chief at the War Office (1941-1944), where his responsibilities included work on the Bolero plan.

In 1944 he became the Prime Minister’s personal representative to the South East Asia Command.

King retired from the army in 1946 with the honorary rank of Lieutenant-General. From 1946 to 1953 he was Colonel Commandant of the Royal Engineers.

Recognition
King was awarded the CBE in 1939 for his work in Quetta and was created CB in 1943. He was made a KBE in 1945.

References

Bibliography

External links

Generals of World War II

1890 births
1967 deaths
British military personnel of the Third Anglo-Afghan War
People educated at Felsted School
American emigrants to the United Kingdom
British Army personnel of World War I
Graduates of the Royal Military Academy, Woolwich
Royal Engineers officers
Commanders of the Order of the British Empire
Knights Commander of the Order of the British Empire
Companions of the Order of the Bath
British Army lieutenant generals
British Army generals of World War II
Academics of the Royal Military Academy, Woolwich
Military personnel from Minnesota